Luka Paichadze (born 6 March 1991) is a Georgian chess player who received the FIDE title of Grandmaster (GM) in September 2012.

Chess career
Paichadze won the Nona Gaprindashvili Cup Open A in 2014, and has twice won the Georgian Chess Championship, in 2017 and 2020.

He qualified for the Chess World Cup 2021.

References

External links
 
 
 

1991 births
Living people
Chess players from Georgia (country)
Chess grandmasters